Bolshoy Sanchur is a rural locality (a village) in Dmitriyevogorskoye Rural Settlement, Melenkovsky District, Vladimir Oblast, Russia. The population was 111 as of 2010.

Geography 
Bolshoy Sanchur is located 28 km southeast of Melenki (the district's administrative centre) by road. Maly Sanchur is the nearest rural locality.

References 

Rural localities in Melenkovsky District
Melenkovsky Uyezd